"Marjorie Daw" is a short story by Thomas Bailey Aldrich. One of Aldrich's first short stories, it was first published in 1869 before its inclusion in the book collection Marjorie Daw and Other People in 1873.

The story is written as a series of letters between two friends. When Jack breaks his leg, and can't get about in fine summer weather, Ed starts writing about a beautiful and kind young woman named Marjorie Daw. Jack becomes madly smitten, and determined to intervene. At last, Ed confesses what had been meant as a diversion:  "For oh, dear Jack [. . . ] -- there isn't any Marjorie Daw!"

Anthologies containing Majorie Daw 

Marjorie Daw and Other People (1873)
The Best American Humorous Short Stories, Alexander Jessup (ed.), 1920, Boni & Liveright
Family Book of Best Loved Short Stories, Leleand W. Lawrence (ed.), 1954, Hanover House
Great American Short Stories, Volume 2, audibook, 2008, BiblioLife, 
Short Story Classics: The Best from the Masters of the Genre

References

External links 

Majorie Daw at Project Gutenburg
Majorie Daw, Goliath, and Other Stories by Thomas Baily Aldrich, at Google Books

American short stories
1869 short stories
Daw, Marjorie
Daw, Marjorie